Oswald Tower (November 23, 1883 – May 28, 1968) was an American basketball administrator and instructor at Phillips Academy Andover [1910-49]. Born in North Adams, Massachusetts, he served on the National Basketball Rules Committee from 1910 to 1960, was an editor of the Official Basketball Guide and an official rules interpreter from 1915 to 1960. He was enshrined in the inaugural class of the Naismith Memorial Basketball Hall of Fame in 1959 as a contributor .

External links
 Basketball Hall of Fame page on Tower

1883 births
1968 deaths
All-American college men's basketball players
Naismith Memorial Basketball Hall of Fame inductees
People from North Adams, Massachusetts
Williams Ephs men's basketball players
American men's basketball players
Sportspeople from Berkshire County, Massachusetts
Basketball players from Massachusetts